Tour do Rio is a road cycling stage race held in Brazil between 2000 and 2015. The race was a 2.2 event in the UCI America Tour.

Name of the race 
 2000 : Volta do Rio de Janeiro
 2002 : Giro do Rio
 2003, 2004, 2007 : Volta do Rio de Janeiro
 2009 :  Volta de Campos
 2010–2015 : Tour do Rio

Past winners

References 
 Official Website

Cycle races in Brazil
UCI America Tour races
Recurring sporting events established in 2000
2000 establishments in Brazil
Sport in Rio de Janeiro (state)